Vivian is the second studio album by American neo soul singer Vivian Green, released by Columbia on May 31, 2005 in Japan and June 28, 2005 in the United States. The album involves production by Scott Storch and James Poyser with additional production from Anthony Bell, Junius Bervine, and Adam Black Stone, among others. Vivian spawned three singles: "Gotta Go Gotta Leave (Tired)", "I Like It (But I Don't Need It)" and "Cursed". The album debuted at number eighteen on the Billboard 200 chart on July 16, 2005 with first-week sales of 46,000 copies.

Critical reception

People magazine called the album a "satisfying sophomore outing" and wrote: "Vivian, with its more straightforward contemporary soul, lacks the jazzy shadings of the superior A Love Story, and the last third of the disc suffers from a few forgettable tracks. By then, however, Green and her everywoman appeal have already left a winning impression." Allmusic editor Andy Kellman felt that Green "sounds more sure of herself here than on A Love Story, and she's also more convincing, regardless of the scenario she's placed within. A few extraneous songs do weigh Vivian down, but it's still a marked improvement over her debut."

PopMatters critic Steve Horowitz found that while "Vivian has many merits, the disc does suffer from too much of the same thing. Not only are the lyrics repetitive in nature, but the basic instrumentation and static beats get tiresome [...] Vivian may be more radio friendly as a result."  Rolling Stone journalist Barry Walters remarked that "trading the jazzy retro-soul of her debut for overly familiar mainstream R&B; beats, Green now strains her pipes like every other overwrought wanna-be diva, with diminished results. Too many tortured relationship songs suggest Green should consider musical and couples counseling."

Chart performance
Vivian debuted at number 18 on the US Billboard 200, and at number 5 on Billboards Top R&B/Hip-Hop Albums chart, scoring first-week sales of 46,000 copies.

The first single from the album, "Gotta Go Gotta Leave (Tired)", peaked at number 24 on the US Hot R&B/Hip-Hop Songs. The single became Green's second top 40 hit on the chart and her second chart-topped on the Hot Dance Club Songs after 2003's "Emotional Rollercoaster." The second single from the album was "I Like It (But I Don't Need It)," another number-one hit on the Hot Dance Club Songs. Third and final single from the album was "Cursed". Released in late 2005, the single didn't match the commercial success of the previous two singles, peaking at a number 2 on the Bubbling Under R&B/Hip-Hop Songs chart, which is equivalent to number 102 on the Hot R&B/Hip-Hop Songs chart.

Track listing

Notes
  denotes co-producer
  denotes additional producer

Credits

David Barnett – viola
Anthony Bell – multi instruments, producer, engineer, string arrangements
Junius Bervine – multi instruments, producer
Zukhan Bey – programming, producer
Adam Blackstone – multi instruments, producer
Jim Bottari – engineer
Jeff Bradshaw – trombone
Alice Butts – art direction, design
Angela Carter  – A&R, management
Chauncey Childs – executive producer, management
Carl Cox, Jr. – saxophone
Kevin "KD" Davis – mixing
Jenny DLorenzo –cello
Omar Edwards – keyboards
Ghislaine Fleishman – violin
Larry Gold – string arrangements
Conrad Golding – engineer
Steve Green – programming
Kevin Hanson – guitar
Kam Houff – engineer, mixing
Gloria Justin – violin
Emma Kummrow – violin
Sandy Leem – viola
Keith Major – photography
John McGlinchey – assistant engineer
Steve McKie – drums, multi instruments, producer
Julie Miller – engineer
Ryan Moys – engineer
Ben ONeill – guitar
Kevin Patrick – producer, A&R
James Poyser – piano, keyboards, programming, producer, string arrangements
Tony Prendatt – mixing
Clayton Sears – guitar, producer
Marni Senofonte – wardrobe
Eric Spearman – make-Up
Scott Storch – producer
Igor Szwec – violin
Chris Theis – mixing
Stephen Tirpak – trumpet
Steve Tirpak – trumpet
Tish Hair – stylist
Chuck Treese – guitar
Che Vicious – programming, producer, mixing
Christopher Weatherbe – keyboards

Charts

Release history

References

External links
 
 

2005 albums
Columbia Records albums
Vivian Green albums